= Peter J. Memmer =

American politician (1886–1959)

Peter J. Memmer (December 17, 1886 – September 7, 1959) was an American businessman and politician.

Memmer was born in Saint Paul, Minnesota and went to the Saint Paul parochial schools. He lived in Saint Paul, Minnesota and was the owner of a retail meat market. Memmer served in the Minnesota Senate in 1925 and 1926.
